The following is a list of programs broadcast by CyBC or RIK (Cyprus Broadcasting Corporation) television stations. CybC was the only Cypriot television network before the launches of ANT1 (in 1993), Mega (Logos TV until the 1990s), and Sigma (in 1995).

Talk shows 
Apo Mera Se Mera (RIK-1)
Ora Kyprou (RIK-1)

Dramas
Epikindyni Zoni (RIK-1)
Genies tis Siopis (RIK-1)
Roda tis Orgis (RIK-1)

Weekly TV shows 
7 meres Kypros
Aktualite, in Turkish
Dialogoi
H Kypros konta sas
Kypros - Evropi
Oikomikos kathreftis
Prizma, in Turkish
Proektaseis
Sto Proskinio

News, sports and morning programs
Alpha News from Greece, (RIK-1)
Athlitikes Eikones, sports (RIK-2)
Epta me deka, morning program (RIK-1)
Fasis & Goal, sports (RIK-2)
RIK1 News in Greek, (RIK-1)
RIK2 News in English, Greek and Turkish, (RIK-2)

Special events 
Eurovision Song Contest
Junior Eurovision Song Contest

Cypriot television shows
Programs broadcast by CyBC, Lists
CyBC